The index of physics articles is split into multiple pages due to its size.

To navigate by individual letter use the table of contents below.

Z

Z' boson
Z(4430)
Z-pinch
ZEPLIN-III
ZETA (fusion reactor)
ZEUS (particle detector)
ZINDO
ZPPR
Zakharov system
Zakharov–Schulman system
Zastruga
Zeeman effect
Zeitschrift für Angewandte Mathematik und Physik
Zeitschrift für Physik C
Zeldovich pancake
Zemax
Zero-dispersion wavelength
Zero-energy universe
Zero-lift drag coefficient
Zero-mode waveguide
Zero-phonon line and phonon sideband
Zero-point energy
Zero differential overlap
Zero gravity (disambiguation)
Zero lift axis
Zero sound
Zeroth law of thermodynamics
Zeta function regularization
Zevatron
Ze'ev Lev
Zhang Jie (scientist)
Zhao Jiuzhang
Zhores Alferov
Zhou Guangzhao
Zhou Peiyuan
Zhu Guangya
Zhurnal Eksperimental'noi i Teoreticheskoi Fiziki
Zia Mian
Zimm–Bragg model
Zinc sulfide
Zinovii Shulman
Zip-cord
Zirconium alloy
Zitterbewegung
Zoltán Lajos Bay
Zonal and poloidal
Zonal flow (plasma)
Zone melting
Zone plate
Zone valve
Zoé (reactor)
Z Pulsed Power Facility
Zsolt Bor
Zubbles
Zygmunt Florenty Wróblewski
Zénobe Gramme

Indexes of physics articles